Spellbinder may refer to:

Film and television
 The Spellbinder, a 1939 American drama film
 Spellbinder (film), a 1988 American supernatural thriller film
 Spellbinder (TV series), a 1995 Australian-Polish science fiction series
 Spellbinder, a sorcerer or sorceress in the animated series Tara Duncan
 Spellbinder, a character in The Adventures of Letterman, a segment from the television series The Electric Company

Games
 Spellbinder (board game), a 1980 game published by Task Force Games
 Spellbinder (paper-and-pencil game), a 1977 simultaneous game by Richard Bartle
 Spellbinder (video game), a 1987 computer game for the BBC Micro and Acorn Electron

Literature
 Spellbinder (Bowkett novel), a 1985 novel by Stephen Bowkett
 Spellbinder, a 2006 novel by Melanie Rawn
 Spellbinder (DC Comics), four supervillains
 Spellbinders, a Marvel Comics limited series

Music
 The Spellbinders, a 1960s American soul group
 Spellbinder (album) or the title song, by Gábor Szabó, 1966
 "Spellbinder", a song by Foreigner from Double Vision, 1978

Other uses
 Spellbinder (software), a 1978 word processing program by Lexisoft, installed on computers made by Eagle Computer and other companies
 Spellbinder (wrestler), Harry Del Rios (born 1972), American professional wrestler